is a passenger railway station located in the city of Takamatsu, Kagawa, Japan.  It is operated by the private transportation company Takamatsu-Kotohira Electric Railroad (Kotoden) and is designated station "S06".

Lines
Kotoden-Yashima Station is a station of the Kotoden Shido Line and is located 5.0 km from the opposing terminus of the line at Kawaramachi Station].

Layout
Kotoden-Yashima Station features a side platform and an island platform serving three tracks. However, only the side platform and one side of the island platform is used in regular service. The station building is located on the eastbound (side) platform, and the two platforms are connected by a level crossing. The station is unmanned.

Platforms

Adjacent stations

History
Kotoden-Yashima Station opened on November 18, 1911 on the Tosan Electric Tramway. On November 1, 1943 it became a station on the Takamatsu-Kotohira Electric Railway. The station building was marked as being a modern industrial heritage on February 6, 2009 by the Ministry of Economy, Trade and Industry.

Surrounding area
Yashima
Takamatsu City Yashima Stadium
Takamatsu Municipal Yashima Junior High School

See also
 List of railway stations in Japan

References

External links

  

Railway stations in Takamatsu
Railway stations in Japan opened in 1911
Stations of Takamatsu-Kotohira Electric Railroad